Tepe Narenj, also Tappe-e Narenj, is the archaeological site for the remains of a 5th or 6th century Buddhist monastery near Kabul, Afghanistan. The site has been excavated under the direction of Zafar Paiman.

History
The Buddhist monk Xuanzang visited the monastery while returning from India in the 7th century. He documented the area's geography and culture in his work, Great Tang Records on the Western Regions. The iconography of the archaeological artifacts recovered demonstrates the practice of Tantric Buddhism in the area. It is believed that Muslim armies destroyed the monastery in the ninth century and was forgotten until post-conflict excavations following the Soviet–Afghan War.

The site
Foundations for the site were discovered by a joint study, conducted by the Afghan Archaeological Research Institute and Japan's National Research Institute for Cultural Properties.

The site lies along a hill and is 250 meters long. It is located south of Lake Koul-e Heshmatkhan, south of Kabul and was discovered beneath a modern police station. The monastery consists of five small stupas for meditation and five chapels. The Afghan Institute of Archaeology continues to excavate at the site for one month each summer since 2005. The site was listed in 2008 among the top 100 sites at risk.

Coins from the Kushans to the Hindu Shahis were found at the site.

Threats
Given the material at the site and the fact that the site is uncovered, it is at significant risk for erosion.  The sculpture found at the site are made of "clay overlaid with fabric and covered with stucco."

Recent political events have meant increased danger for the site as damage from looters, armed conflict and insufficient management continue to be threats.

Notes

References

Archaeological sites in Afghanistan
Buildings and structures in Kabul
Monasteries in Afghanistan
Buddhism in Afghanistan